Denis Gennadyevich Tkachuk (born 2 July 1989) is a Russian professional football player. He plays as a left midfielder or left back for Volgar Astrakhan.

Club career
He made his Russian Premier League debut for FC Zenit Saint Petersburg on 12 September 2015 in a game against PFC CSKA Moscow.

On 18 January 2016, he signed a contract with FC Rubin Kazan.

On 29 June 2017, he returned to PFC Krylia Sovetov Samara, signing a 2-year contract.

On 19 August 2019, he signed with FC Rotor Volgograd.

In the 2020–21 season, Tkachuk's club FC Orenburg finished in the 2nd place in the FNL, which normally is awarded promotion to Russian Premier League, but were not licensed for it and replaced by the 3rd-placed FNL club FC Nizhny Novgorod. On 1 July 2021, Tkachuk moved from Orenburg to Nizhny Novgorod.

International
In November 2016, he was called up to the Russia national football team for the first time for the friendly games against Qatar on 10 November 2016 and Romania on 15 November 2016.

Career statistics

References

External links
 
 

1989 births
People from Belgorod
Sportspeople from Belgorod Oblast
Living people
Russian footballers
Russia national football B team footballers
Association football midfielders
FC Salyut Belgorod players
FC Orenburg players
PFC Krylia Sovetov Samara players
FC Zenit-2 Saint Petersburg players
FC Zenit Saint Petersburg players
FC Rubin Kazan players
FC Rotor Volgograd players
FC Nizhny Novgorod (2015) players
FC Urozhay Krasnodar players
FC Volgar Astrakhan players
Russian Premier League players
Russian First League players
Russian Second League players